The structure of the Armed Forces of Ukraine is multifaceted.

In late 2010 the total personnel (including 41,000 civilian workers) was 200,000.  Conscription was ended in October 2013; at that time the Ukrainian armed forces were made up of 40% conscripts and 60% contract soldiers. In April 2014 acting President Oleksandr Turchynov reinstated conscription in May 2014.

In early 2014, Ukraine had 130,000 personnel in its armed forces that could be boosted to about one million with reservists.

There is a reported total of 250,800 personnel in the Armed Forces in 2015.

Following the Russian aggression, Ukraine has adopted a new military doctrine (third edition) which made the Russian Federation its main opponent and announced Ukraine's intentions for closer relations with NATO armed services, most especially if it joins the organization in the future.

The law 'On the Foundations of National Resistance' (Закон «Про основи національного спротиву», Section IX, Article 2. - 6) establishes the following structure of the Ukrainian Armed Forces: the General Staff of the Ukrainian Armed Forces (Генеральний штаб Збройних Сил України); the Joint Forces Command of the Ukrainian Armed Forces (Командування об’єднаних сил Збройних Сил України); three UAF services, being the 
Ground Forces (Сухопутні війська); Air Force (Повітряні Сили), and Navy (Військово-Морські Сили) five separate branches (окремі роди сил Збройних Сил України):  the Special Operations Forces Command (Командування Сил спеціальних операцій); the Territorial Defense Command (Командування територіальної оборони); the Logistical Forces Command (Командування Сил логістики); the Support Forces Command (Командування Сил підтримки); and the Medical Forces Command (Командування Медичних сил). In addition there are two separate troop arms (окремі роди військ Збройних Сил України) - the Air Landing Assault Troops Command (Командування Десантно-штурмових військ), and the Signals and Cyber-Security Troops Command (Командування Військ зв'язку та кібербезпеки). There are also organs of military command and control, formations and units, which are separate from the services, branches and arms (органи військового управління, з’єднання, військові частини, вищі військові навчальні заклади, військові навчальні підрозділи закладів вищої освіти, установи та організації, що не належать до видів та окремих родів військ (сил) Збройних Сил України.)

Supreme Command Authority

Supreme Commander-in-Chief of the Armed Forces 
The President of Ukraine holds the title of Supreme Commander-in-Chief of the Armed Forces (Ukr.: Верховний Головнокомандувач Збройних Сил України). The holder of the office presides over several councils, which direct the security policies of the state:

Council for National Security and Defence of Ukraine 
The Council for National Security and Defence of Ukraine (Рада національної безпеки і оборони України) is the highest national organ for the management of Ukraine's national security. It is headed by the President (Голова Ради національної безпеки і оборони України - Верховний Головнокомандувач Збройних сил України) and includes the Chairman of the Verkhovna Rada, the Prime Minister and other members of the Council of Ministers, the Commander-in-Chief of the Armed Forces, the Chief of the Foreign Intelligence Service, the Chief of the National Police and other high-ranking officials. The council has its Apparatus (or Secretariat, Апарат Ради національної безпеки і оборони України).

Military Cabinet at the Council for National Security and Defence of Ukraine 
The Military Cabinet at the Council for National Security and Defence of Ukraine (Воєнний кабінет при Раді національної безпеки i оборони України) acts as a section of the CNSDU and while the wider body is tasked with the national security in the broader sense, including financial security, foreign policy, social policy etc., the Military Cabinet is concentrated on the military threats to national defence. Some of the members of the CNSDU are also members of its Military Cabinet (The President, the Prime Minister, the ministers of interior affairs, of foreign affairs, of defence, the Chairman of the Verkhovna Rada, the Commander-in-Chief of the Armed Forces, the Chief of the Office of the President, the Chief of the National Security Service) and additional members of the Military Cabinet include the Chief of the General Staff, Chief of the State Border Guard Service and the Chief of the National Guard).

War Staff of the Supreme Commander-in-Chief of the Armed Forces 
In case of war Article 7 of the Ukrainian Law "On the Armed Forces of Ukraine" (Про Збройні Сили України) prescribes the formation of a War Staff of the Supreme Commander-in-Chief (Ставка Верховного Головнокомандувача) as an advisory council aiding the President in the command of the armed forces. In light of the 2022 Russian invasion of Ukraine this provision was enacted for the first time when President Volodymyr Zelenskyy has issued an executive order on February 25 with the following composition of the War Staff:

 Head of the War Staff (Голова Ставки Верховного Головнокомандувача)
 Zelenskyy, Volodimir Oleksandrovich - President of Ukraine, Supreme Commander-in-Chief of the Armed Forces of Ukraine
 Coordinator of the War Staff (Координатор Ставки Верховного Головнокомандувача)
 Danilov, Oleksiy Myacheslavovich - Secretary of the Council for National Security and Defence of Ukraine
 Members of the War Staff (Члени Ставки Верховного Головнокомандувача)
 Stefanchuk, Ruslan Oleksiyovich - Chairman of the Verkhovna Rada
 Shmigal', Denis Anatoliyovich - Prime Minister of Ukraine
 Reznikov, Oleksiy Yuriyovich - Minister of Defense
 Monastirs'kiy, Denis Anatoliyovich - Ministry of Internal Affairs
 Kuleba, Dmitro Ivanovich - Minister of Foreign Affairs
 Yermak, Andriy Borisovich - Head of the Office of the President of Ukraine
 General Zaluzhniy, Valeriy Fyodorovich - Commander-in-Chief of the Armed Forces of Ukraine
 Major-General Budanov, Kirilo Oleksiyovich - Director of the Chief Directorate of Intelligence of the Ministry of Defence
 Brigadier General Mirgorods'kiy, Maksim Viktorovich - Commander of the Air Assault Forces
 Major-General Halahan, Hrihoriy Anatoliyovich - Commander of the Special Operations Forces
 Brigadier General Halushkin, Yuriy Alimovich - Commander of the Territorial Defense Forces
 Bakanov, Ivan Hennadiyovich - Chief of the Security Service
 Litvinenko, Oleksandr Valeriyovich - Chief of the Foreign Intelligence Service
 Lieutenant-General Lebid', Yuriy Anatoliyovich - Chief of the National Guard
 Police General First Rank (equal to Lt.-Gen.) Klimenko, Ihor Volodimirovich - Chief of the National Police
 Major-General Deynenko, Serhiy Vasilyovich - Chief of the State Border Guard Service
 Major-General Rud', Serhiy Leonidovich - Director of the State Security Administration
 Brigadier General Shtihol', Yuriy Fedorovich - Chief of the State Service for Special Communications and Information Security
 Major-General Kruk, Serhiy Ivanovich - Chief of the State Emergency Service

Commander-in-Chief of the Armed Forces 
The highest-ranking military officer is the Commander-in-Chief of the Armed Forces of Ukraine (Головнокомандувач Збройних сил України) in the rank of a full General / Admiral. The position was created on March 27, 2020, by Executive Order No.123/2020 of the President. Until then the Chief of the General Staff was also the Commander-in-Chief of the UAF. The two responsibilities were split in order for the newly created C-in-C UAF to take a more direct role in the overall command of the troops and the CGS to retain the administrative and long-term planning role.

Commander-in-Chief of the Armed Forces of Ukraine (Головнокомандувач Збройних сил України) - General Zaluzhnyi, Valerii Fyodorovich

Deputy Commander-in-Chief of the Armed Forces of Ukraine (Заступник Головнокомандувача Збройних сил України) - Lieutenant-General Moysyuk, Yevhen Heorgiyovich

The C-in-C AFU is aided in his activities by the Kyiv-based Office of the Commander in Chief of the Armed Forces.

Office of the Commander in Chief of the Armed Forces 
Apparatus [Office] of the Commander-in-Chief of the Armed Forces of Ukraine (Апарат головнокомандувача Збройних Сил України)

 Office Command
 Strategic Communications Directorate
 Automatization Development Directorate
 Internal Control Directorate
 Office of Advisors 
 Office of Assistants of the C-in-C UAF
 Department of Protocol
 Secret Documents Support Section

The position of the C-in-C AFU has been established by the Law "On the Transformation of the Joint Command and Control System of the Defence Forces" ("Про трансформацію системи об'єднаного керівництва силами оборони") as the supreme professional authority on matters of national defence and security, therefore the incumbent holder has direct control over the Chief of the General Staff, Commander of the Joint Forces, commanders of the various armed services, separate arms and branches and separate military units, as well as shared authority with the Minister of Interior Affairs and the chiefs of the various national security services on matters of strategic planning, generation of forces and principles for their actions in case of a state of a martial law, as well as operational control during wartime.

Chief of the General Staff 
The General Staff of the Armed Forces of Ukraine is the main body of military management for strategic planning of the Armed Forces of Ukraine and other forces and means of other components of the defence forces, coordination and control over defence tasks between government services, regional governments and municipal bodies and the defence forces in the manner established by the country's legal framework, acts of the President of Ukraine and the Cabinet of Ministers of Ukraine and defense legislation of the Supreme Council.

Commander of the Joint Forces Command, Armed Forces of Ukraine 
The main functional purpose of the Joint Forces Command is to plan and manage the joint forces of the AFU in operations to repel armed aggression against Ukraine and to command and control national contingents and personnel involved in international peacekeeping and security operations. The Joint Forces Command is the successor to the former  Joint Operational Headquarters of the Armed Forces of Ukraine. It is headed by the Joint Forces Commander, who reports directly to the Commander-in-Chief of the Armed Forces of Ukraine and directs the Joint Forces in all domains of their application (land, air, sea, information). The JFC is the command authority for the Joint Forces Operation (Операція об'єднаних сил) in the eastern Russian-occupied separatist regions of Donetsk and Luhansk, an operation which took over from the previous Anti-Terrorist Operation (ATO).

Commanders of the armed services, separate combat arms and support branches 
The commanders of the three main armed services - the Ground Forces, Air Force and the Navy, report to the C-in-C UAF and their main role is to provide force generation and readiness of their respective services, arms and branches. The commanders of the two separate combat arms - the Air Assault Forces and the Special Operations Forces also report to the C-in-C, but unlike the three armed services commanders, they are invested both with a force generation role, as well as operational command and control of their units. Operational command and control is executed by services, arms and branches-specific component commands under the Joint Forces Command.

Armed services:

 Commander of the Ukrainian Ground Forces
 Commander of the Ukrainian Air Force
 Commander of the Ukrainian Navy

Separate combat arms:

 Commander of the Air Assault and Airborne Forces
 Commander of the Signals and Cybernetic Security Forces

Separate support branches:

 Commander of the Support Forces
 Commander of the Logistical Forces
 Commander of the Medical Forces

Special Operations Forces:

The Special Operations Forces are a special separate combat arm. Unlike the Air Assault and Airborne Forces and the Signals and Cybernetic Security Forces, which are subordinated operationally to the Commander of the Joint Forces, the SOF report both administratively and operationally directly to C-in-C UAF.

 Commander of the Special Operations Forces

The Military Police is a separate service subordinated to the Minister of Defence.

Shared role in strategic planning 
The C-in-C AFU shares the strategic planning for the development of various services, which are outside of the Armed Forces during peacetime, but are transferred in cases of wartime mobilization under his office.

Services under the Ministry of Defence:

 State Special Transport Service (Державна спеціальна служба транспорту) - the former Railway Troops (1992- 2004). It includes a central Administration (Military Unit [MU] Т0100, Kiyv); the 1st Separate, named after Prince Leo, Brigade of the SSTS (1 окрема бригада імені князя Лева Державної спеціальної служби транспорту) (MU Т0110, Lviv); the 26th Separate Dniprovs'ka Brigade (26 окрема Дніпровська бригада) (MU Т0120, Dnipro); the 36th [Rail-]Road Repair and Overhaul Konotops'kiy Regiment (36 шляхо-відновлювальний Конотопський полк) (MU Т0330, Konotop); the 194th Pontoon-Bridging Regiment (194 понтонно-мостовий полк) (MU Т0320, Novomoskovs'k), the 195th Central Base for Railway Equipment (195 центральна база залізничної техніки) (MU Т0710, Kiyv) and two training establishments - the Chair for Training of Military Specialists of the SSTS at the Dnipropetrovs'k National University for Rail Transport (Кафедра військової підготовки спеціалістів Держспецтрансслужби Дніпропетровського національного університету залізничного транспорту) (in Dnipro) and the 8th Training Chernihiv Center of the SSTS (8 навчальний Чернігівський центр Держспецтрансслужби України) (MU Т0500, Chernihiv)

Services under the Ministry of Internal Affairs:

 National Guard of Ukraine (Національна гвардія України)
 National Police of Ukraine (Національна поліція України)
 State Emergency Service of Ukraine (Державна служба України з надзвичайних ситуацій)

Services under the Administration of the President:

 State Border Guard Service of Ukraine (Державна прикордонна служба України)
 State Special Communications Service of Ukraine (Державна служба спеціального зв'язку та захисту інформації України)

Ministry of Defence 
The following establishments and institutions are directly subordinate to the Ministry of Defence.

Structures directly subordinated to the Ukrainian Ministry of Defence (Структури безпосереднього підпорядкування Міністерства оборони України)

Ukrainian Ministry of Defence Apparatus (Апарат Міністерства оборони України), Kyiv

 Main Intelligence Directorate (Головне управління розвідки)
 Security Service of the MoD (Патронатна служба Міністра оборони України)
 Main Inspection (Головна інспекція)
 Defence Policies Directorate (Директорат політики у сфері оборони)
 Defence Information Policies and Strategic Communications Directorate  (Директорат інформаційної політики у сфері оборони та стратегічних комунікацій)
 Military Education and Science Department (Департамент військової освіти і науки)
 Military Technical Policies, Development and Military Weaponry and Equipment Department (Департамент військово-технічної політики, розвитку озброєння та військової техніки)
 Internal Audit department (Департамент внутрішнього аудиту)
 Military Policies and Strategic Planning Department (Департамент воєнної політики та стратегічного планування)
 State Purchases and Deliveries of Material Resources Department (Департамент державних закупівель та постачання матеріальних ресурсів)
 Information Organisation Works and Control Department (Департамент інформаційно-організаційної роботи та контролю)
 Personnel Policies Department (Департамент кадрової політики)
 International Defence Co-operation Department (Департамент міжнародного оборонного співробітництва)
 Social and Personnel Policies Support Department (Департамент соціального та гуманітарного забезпечення)
 Financial Department (Департамент фінансів)
 Judicial Support Department (Департамент юридичного забезпечення)
 Military Representations Directorate (Управління військових представництв)
 Anti-Corruption Directorate (Управління з питань запобігання та виявлення корупції)
 State Secrets Security Directorate (Управління охорони державної таємниці)
 Press and Information Directorate (Управління преси та інформації)
 Physical Culture and Sport Directorate (Управління фізичної культури і спорту)
 Control Measures Co-ordination Unit (Відділ координації контрольних заходів)
 Mobilisation Preparedness Unit (Мобілізаційний відділ)

State Aviation Scientific Development Institute (Державний науково-дослідний інститут авіації), Kyiv

State Scientific Test Center of the AFU (Державний науково-випробувальний центр Збройних Сил України) (MU А4444), Honcharivsk, Chernihiv Oblast

Central Scientific Research Institute of the AFU (Центральний науково-дослідний інститут Збройних Сил України) (MU А0202), Kyiv

Central Military Weaponry and Equipment Scientific Research Institute of the AFU (Центральний науково-дослідний інститут озброєння і військової техніки ЗСУ) (MU А4566), Kyiv

Scientific Research Center of the Rocket Forces and Field Artillery (Науково-дослідний центр ракетних військ і артилерії) (MU А????), Sumy, Sumy Oblast

Scientific Research Center for Humanitarian Matters of the AFU (Науково-дослідний центр гуманітарних проблем Збройних Сил України) (MU А2350), Kyiv

Central Directorate for Acquisition and Delivery of Material Supplies of the AFU (Центральне управління розвитку та супроводження матеріального забезпечення ЗСУ), Kyiv

Codification Bureau (Бюро кодифікації) (MU А2387), Kyiv

Military Delegations of the MoU (Військові представництва Міністерства оборони)

other directly subordinated units under the Ministry (iнші безпосередньо підпорядковані структури)

Chief of the General Staff 
The Chief of the General Staff of the Armed Forces of Ukraine (Начальник Генерального штабу Збройних Сил України) oversees the strategic planning and force generation of the Armed Forces of Ukraine.

Chief of the General Staff (Начальник Генерального штабу) - Lieutenant-General Shaptala, Serhiy Oleksandrovich

[First] Deputy Chief of the General Staff (Заступник Начальника ГШ) - Lieutenant-General Bokiy, Viktor Hrihorovich

Deputy Chief of the General Staff (Заступник Начальника ГШ) - Brigadier General Kirilenko, Oleksandr Mykolayovich

Deputy Chief of the General Staff (Заступник Начальника ГШ) - Colonel Koval', Volodimir Valeriyovich

General Staff of the Armed Forces of Ukraine (Генеральний штаб Збройних Сил України), Kyiv

 Deputy Chiefs of the General Staff of the UAF (Заступники начальника Генерального штабу Збройних Сил України)
 J-1 Main Directorate of Personnel (J-1 Головне управлiння персоналу)
 J-2 Intelligence Organ (J-2 Розвiдувальний орган)
 J-3 Main Directorate of Operations (J-3 Головне оперативне управлiння)
 J-4 Main Directorate of Logistics (J-4 Головне управлiння логiстики)
 J-5 Main Directorate of Defence Planning (J-5 Головне управлiння оборонного планування)
 J-6 Central Directorate of Communication and Information Systems (J-6 Центральне управлiння зв'язку та iнформацiйних систем)
 J-7 Main Directorate of Doctrine and Training (J-7 Головне управлiння доктрин та пiдготовки)
 J-8 Central Directorate of Defence Resources (J-8 Центральне управлiння оборонних ресурсiв)
 J-9 Directorate of Civil-Military Cooperation (J-9 Управлiння цивiльно-вiйськового спiвробiтництва)
 Military Scientific Directorate (Воєнно-наукове управлiння)
 Central Directorate for Protection of State Secrets and Security (Центральне управлiння охорони державної таємницi та захисту)
 Legal Support Directorate (Управлiння правового забезпечення)
 Financial Directorate (Фiнансове управлiння)  Administrative Directorate (Адмiнiстративне управлiння)

Directly reporting formations of the General Staff 
The following are units directly subordinated to the General Staff of the Armed Forces of Ukraine (частини безпосереднього підпорядкування Генеральному штабу ЗС України)

 Joint Forces Command of the Armed Forces of Ukraine (Командування об'єднаних сил Збройних Сил України) (MU А0135), Kyiv
 Main Command Center of the Armed Forces of Ukraine (Головний командний центр Збройних Сил України) (MU А0911), Kyiv
 Back-up Command Center of the UAF (Запасний командний пункт Генерального штабу Збройних Сил України) (MU А3258), Radomyshl, Zhytomyr Oblast
 15th Airborne Command and Control Center of the General Staff of the AFU (15 повітряний пункт управління ГШ ЗСУ) (MU А0905), Vinnytsia, Vinnytsia Oblast
 Main Directorate for Moral and Psychological Support of the AFU (Головне управління морально-психологічного забезпечення ЗСУ), Kyiv
 Main Directorate for  Military Cooperation and Verification of the AFU (Головне управління військового співробітництва і верифікації ЗСУ), Kyiv
 Central Military Security Directorate (Центральне управління безпеки військової служби), Kyiv
 Directorate for Career Development of NCO Personnel (Управління по роботі з сержантським складом), Kyiv
 101st Separate Security Brigade of the General Staff 'Colonel-General Henadii Vorobiov (101 окрема бригада охорони Генерального штабу iмені генерал-полковника Генадія Воробйова) (МУ А0139), Kyiv
 other units and establishments directly under the General Staff of the AFU (iнші частини та установи безпосереднього підпорядкування Генерального штабу ЗС України)

Military Education Establishments and Units (directly under the MoD) (військові навчальні заклади та частини (які не входять до видів Збройних Сил України))

 National Defense University of Ukraine 'Ivan Chernyakhovsky (Національний університет оборони України імені І.Черняховського), Kyiv
 Military Institute of the Taras Shevchenko National University of Kyiv (Військовий інститут Київського національного університету імені Т.Шевченка), Kyiv
 Zhytomyr Military Institute 'Sergei Korolev''' (Житомирський військовий інститут імені С.Корольова), Zhytomyr, Zhytomyr Oblast
 190th Training Center (190 навчальний центр), Huyva, Zhytomyr Oblast
 Military Judicial Institute of the Yaroslav Mudryi National Law University (Військово-юридичний інститут Національного юридичного університету імені Ярослава Мудрого), Kharkiv, Kharkiv Oblast
 Kyiv Military High School 'Ivan Bohun (Київський військовий ліцей імені Івана Богуна), Kyiv

 Joint Forces Command 
The Commander of the Joint Forces has direct command and control over the operational combat, combat support and combat service support units, involved in military operations in land and overseas and military exercises during peacetime, as well as during wartime operations.

 Joint Forces Operation (Операція об'єднаних сил), commands the armed forces and security forces contingents facing the Russian-controlled Donbass separatist forces, successor to the previous Anti-Terror Operation (ATO). The forces deployed in the JFO are also known as the Joint Forces Groupment (Угруповання Об'єднаних сил) (Commander of the JFO: Major-General Edouard Moskalyov)
 Ground Forces operational forces:
 Operational Command "West" (Оперативне командування «Захід» (ОК «Захід»), MU А0796), HQ in Rivne, Rivne Oblast, Commander: Major-General Serhiy Litvinov, the AOR covers 8 oblasts: Volyn, Zakarpattia, Ivano-Frankivsk, Lviv, Rivne, Ternopil, Khmelnitsky and Chernivtsi oblasts.
 Operational Command "South" (Оперативне командування «Південь» (ОК «Південь»), MU А2393), HQ in Odesa, Odesa Oblast, Commander: Major-General Andriy Koval'chuk, the AOR covers 5 oblasts: Vinnytsia, Kirovohrad, Mykolaiv, Odesa and Kherson oblasts, as well as nominally Russian-occupied Crimea and the city of Sevastopol, designated as the Separate Military Ground Forces Area (Окремий військово-сухопутний район).
 Operational Command "North" (Оперативне командування «Північ» (ОК «Північ»), MU А4583), HQ in the capital Kyiv, Commander: Major-General Viktor Nikolyuk, the AOR covers six oblasts: Kyiv, Zhytomyr, Poltava, Sumy, Cherkassy and Chernihiv oblasts and the capital city of Kyiv.
 Operational Command "East" (Оперативне командування «Схід» (ОК «Схід»), MU А1314), HQ in Dnipro, Dnipropetrovsk Oblast, Commander: Major-General Oleh Mikats, AOR covers five oblasts: Zaporizhzhia, Dnipropetrovsk, Kharkiv, Donetsk and Luhansk oblasts, although forces involved in the JFO operate independently. області.
 Directly reporting units (Частини безпосереднього підпорядкування) - Missile and Rocket Forces and Artillery; Army Aviation etc.
 Air Force operational forces:
 Air Force Command "West" (Повітряне командування «Захід» (ПвК «Захід»), MU А0780), HQ in Lviv, Lviv Oblast, Commander:  Major-General Oleksiy Marchenko, AOR covers Volyn, Zakarpattia, Ivano-Frankivsk, Lviv, Rivne, Ternopil, Khmelnitsky and Chernivtsi oblasts.
 Air Force Command "South" (Повітряне командування «Південь» (ПвК «Південь»), MU А0800), HQ in Odesa, Odesa Oblast, Commander: Lieutenant-General Vasil' Chernenko, AOR covers  completely Odesa, Mykolaiv and Kherson oblasts, parts of Dnipropetrovsk, Kirovohrad and Zaporizhzhia oblast as well as nominally the territory of Russian-occupied Crimea with the city of Sevastopol, designated as the Separate Military Air Force Area (Окремий військово-повітряний район).
 Air Force Command "Center" (Повітряне командування «Центр» (ПвК «Центр»), MU А0820), HQ in Vasylkiv Air Base, Kyiv Oblast, south of the capital city of Kyiv, Commander: Lieutenant-General Anatoliy Krivonozhko, AOR covers completely Vinnytsia, Zhytomyr, Kyiv, Cherkassy and Chernihiv oblasts, parts of Poltava, Sumy and Kirovohrad oblasts and the capital city of Kyiv itself.
 Air Force Command "East" (Повітряне командування «Схід» (ПвК «Схід»), MU А2533), HQ in Dnipro, Dnipropetrovsk Oblast, Commander: Major-General Ivan Теребуха, AOR covers completely Dnipropetrovsk, Kharkiv, Donetsk and Luhansk oblasts and parts of Zaporizhzhia, Kirovohrad, Poltava and Sumy oblasts.
 Directly reporting units (Частини безпосереднього підпорядкування) - fighter-bomber aviation, UAV aviation, transport aviation, signals, electronic warfare, command and control units etc.
 Navy operational forces:
 Ukrainian Navy Flotilla (Флотилія Військово-Морських Сил України (Флотилія ВМСУ), MU А0437), HQ in Odesa, Odesa Oblast, Commander: Captain First Rank Yuriy Fedash
 Marine Infantry Command (Командування морської піхоти, MU А2022), HQ in Mykolaiv, Mykolaiv Oblast, Lieutenant-General Yuriy Sodol'
 Directly reporting units (Частини безпосереднього підпорядкування) - naval aviation brigade, anti-ship missiles and artillery, naval bases, other support units
 Air Assault Forces operational forces:
 Air Assault Troops Command (Командування Десантно-штурмових військ (КДШВ ЗСУ), MU А3771), HQ in Zhytomyr, Zhytomyr Oblast, Commander: Major-General Maksim Mirgorodsk'kiy
 Combat support and combat service support forces:
 Signals and Cyber Defence Troops Command UAF (Командування Військ зв'язку та кібернетичної безпеки Збройних Сил (Ком ВЗтаКБ ЗС), MU А0106), HQ in Kyiv, Commander: Major-General Yevhen Stepanenko
 Support Forces Command UAF (Командування Сил підтримки Збройних сил України (КСП ЗСУ), MU А2330), HQ in Kyiv, Commander: Brigade General Dmitro Herekha
 Logistical Forces Command UAF (Командування Сил логістики Збройних сил (КСЛ ЗСУ), MU А0307), HQ in Kyiv, Commander: Major-General Oleh Hulyak
 Medical Forces Command UAF (Командування Медичних сил Збройних Сил України (КМС ЗСУ), MU А0928), HQ in Kyiv, Commander: Brigade General Tetyana Ostashchenko

 Ukrainian Ground Forces 

As of 2016, there were a reported 169,000 personnel in the Ukrainian Ground Forces. The Ukrainian Ground Forces are divided into Armoured and Mechanized Forces, Army Aviation, Army Air Defence and Rocket and Artillery Troops. There are 13 mechanized brigades and two mountain warfare brigades in the Mechanized Forces. Ukraine also has two armoured brigades. There are also seven rocket and artillery brigades. Until 2013, the Ground Forces were divided into three army corps. These were disbanded in 2013 and reorganized as Operation Command West, Operation Command North and Operation Command South. Operation Command East was formed in 2015 to coordinate forces in the war in Donbas.   

 Ukrainian Air Force 
In 2016, the Ukrainian Air Force was reported to have included 36,300 personnel.

 Ukrainian Navy 

According to an August 2015 Kyiv Post report, the Ukrainian Navy consisted of 6,500 personnel.

 Air Assault and Airborne Forces 
The Ukrainian Airborne and Air Assault Forces are composed of 8 air landing, air assault and air-mobile brigades and support units.

Airborne and Air Assault Forces Command (Командування Десантно-штурмових військ) (MU А3771), Zhytomyr, Zhytomyr Oblast

 support units (частини забезпечення)
 135th Separate Command Battalion (135 окремий батальйон управління), Zhytomyr, Zhytomyr Oblast
 347th Information and Telecommunications Nod (347-й інформаційно-телекомунікаційний вузол), Zhytomyr, Zhytomyr Oblast
 Airborne Forces Support Commandature (комендатура десантного забезпечення)
 132nd Separate Reconnaissance Battalion (132-й окремий розвідувальний батальйон), Ozerne Air Base, Zhytomyr Oblast
 102nd Separate Storage for Airborne Vehicles and Equipment (102-й окремий склад зберігання повітрянодесантної техніки та майна), Zhytomyr, Zhytomyr Oblast
 232nd Joint Supply Base (232-га об'єднана база забезпечення), Rakhni village, Vinnytsia Oblast
 124th Topographic Unit (124-та топографічна частина), Zhytomyr, Zhytomyr Oblast (part of the Military Topographic Service (of the Support Forces Command) attached to the Air Assault and Airborne Forces)
 combat forces (Склад десантно-штумових військ Збройних сил України)
 airborne
 [[25th Airborne Brigade (Ukraine)|25th Separate Airborne 'Sicheslavska Brigade]] (25-та окрема повітрянодесантна Січеславська бригада) (MU А1126), смт. Гвардійське Новомосковського району Дніпропетровської області
 air assault
 45th Separate Air Landing Assault Brigade (45-та окрема десантно-штурмова бригада) (MU A????), Болград, Одеська область
 46th Separate Air Landing Assault Brigade (46-та окрема десантно-штурмова бригада) (MU A????), Полтава, Полтавська область
 79th Separate Air Landing Assault Brigade (79-та окрема десантно-штурмова бригада) (MU А0224), Миколаїв, Миколаївська область
 80th Separate Air Landing Assault Brigade (80 окрема десантно-штурмова бригада) (MU А0284), А2582, м. Львів, м. Чернівці
 95th Separate Air Landing Assault Brigade (95 окрема десантно-штурмова бригада) (MU А0281), Zhytomyr, Zhytomyr Oblast
 air mobile
 81st Separate Airmobile Brigade (81-ша окрема аеромобільна бригада), Kramatorsk, Donetsk Oblast
 23rd Separate Tank Battalion (23 окремий танковий батальйон), Velikyi Kobilin, Zhytomyr Oblast
 148th Separate Howitzer Self-Propelled Artillery Battalion (148 окремий гаубичний самохідний артилерійський дивізіон), Zhytomyr, Zhytomyr Oblast
 training units (навчальні частини)
 199th Training Center (199-й навчальний центр), Zhytomyr, Zhytomyr Oblast
 37th Combined Arms Training Range (37-й загальновійськовий полігон), Perlyavka village, Teterіvka District, Zhytomyr, Zhytomyr Oblast

 Special Forces 
Ukraine's special forces are reported as 4,000 strong.

Special Operations Forces Command (Командування сил спеціальних операцій) (Military Unit [MU] А0987), Kyiv

 command and combat support units (частини управління й бойового забезпечення):
 99th Separate Command and Support Battalion (99-й окремий батальйон управління та забезпечення) (MU А3628), Berdychiv, Zhytomyr Oblast
 142nd Education and Training Center (142-й навчально-тренувальний центр) (MU А2772), Berdychiv, Zhytomyr Oblast
 land warfare special purpose units (сухопутні частини спеціального призначення):
 3rd Separate Special Purpose Regiment 'Prince Sviatoslav the Brave (3-й окремий полк спеціального призначення імені князя Святослава Хороброго)  (MU А0680), Kropyvnytskyi, Kirovohrad Oblast
 8th Separate Special Purpose Regiment 'Iziaslav Mstislavich (8-й окремий полк спеціального призначення ім. Ізяслава Мстиславовича)  (MU A0553), Khmelnitskyi, Khmelnytskyi Oblast
 140th Separate Special Operations Forces Center (140-й окремий центр сил спеціальних операцій)  (MU А0661), Khmelnitskyi, Khmelnytskyi Oblast
 seaborne special purpose units (морські частини спеціального призначення):
 73rd Maritime Special Operations Center 'Kish otaman Antin Holovaty (73-й морський центр спеціальних операцій імені кошового отамана Антіна Головатого) (MU A3199), Pervomayskiy Island, Ochakiv, Mykolaiv Oblast
 aviation special purpose units (авіаційні частини спеціального призначення):
 35th Mixed Aviation Squadron (35-та змішана авіаційна ескадрилья), Havryshivka Air Base (Vinnytsia IAP), Vinnytsia Oblast

 Signals and Cybernetic Security Forces 
The Signals and Cybernetic Security Troops Command of the Ukrainian Armed Forces (Командування Військ зв'язку та кібернетичної безпеки Збройних Сил України) is a separate joint forces command under the General Staff since February 5, 2020.Signals and Cybernetic Security Troops Command (Командування Військ зв'язку та кібербезпеки) (MU А0106), Kyiv

 Main Command Post of the Signals and Information Systems (Головний пункт управління системою зв'язку та інформаційних систем) (MU А2666), Kyiv
 Main Center for Information and Telecommunications Systems Security Control (Головний центр контролю безпеки в інформаційно-телекомунікаційних системах) (MU А0334), Kyiv
 Main Information and Telecommunications Nod (Головний інформаційно-телекомунікаційний вузол) (MU А0351), Kyiv
 1st Separate Field 'Proskurov Signals Nod (1 окремий польовий Проскурівський вузол зв'язку) (MU А0565), Kyiv
 3rd Separate Signals Brigade (3 окрема бригада зв'язку) (MU А0415), Semipolki, Kyiv Oblast
 8th Separate Signals Regiment (8 окремий полк зв'язку) (MU А0707), Haisyn, Vinnytsia Oblast
 330th Central Nod of the Feldjaeger-Postal [Field Courier] Service (330 центральний вузол фельд'єгерсько-поштового зв'язку) (MU А0168), Kyiv
 1899th Central Base for Repair and Overhaul of Special Signals Equipment (1899 центральна база ремонту та зберігання засобів зв'язку) (MU А0476), Kyiv

training establishments and units (навчальні заклади (частини))

 Military Institute for Telecommunications and Information Automatization (MITIA) 'Heroes of Kruty (Військовий інститут телекомунікацій та інформатизації імені Героїв Крут), Kyiv
 Military College for NCO Personnel of the MITIA (Військовий коледж сержантського складу ВІТІ), Poltava, Poltava Oblast
 179th Joint Education and Training Center of the Signals Troops (179 об'єднаний навчально-тренувальний центр військ зв'язку) (MU А3990), Poltava, Poltava Oblast

under other services and troops (iнші види та роди військ (сил))

 Signals and Information Systems Center of the Joint Forces Command of the Ukrainian Armed Forces (Центр зв’язку та інформаційних систем Командування об'єднаних сил ЗСУ), Kyiv
 signals and information systems directorates to the headquarters of the ground forces, air force, navy, air landing and assault troops, special operations forces, territorial defence forces, support forces, logistical forces etc. (управління зв’язку та інформаційних систем штабів КСВ, КПС, КВМС, КДШВ, КССпО, КСТрО, КСП, КСЛ, відділ ЗІС КМС, з підпрядкованими частинами та підрозділами зв'язку)

 Support Forces 
Since January 1, 2022  the support forces have the status of a separate joint branch under the General Staff.Support Forces Command (Командування Сил підтримки) (Military Unit [MU] А2330), Kyiv

 Central Directorate of Engineer Troops of the UAF (Центральне управління інженерних військ ЗС України) (MU А0107), Kyiv
 20th Arsenal of the Engineer Troops (20 арсенал інженерних військ) (MU А0543), Olshanytsia, Kyiv Oblast and Nizhyn, Chernihiv Oblast
 47th Engineer Brigade (47 інженерна бригада) (MU А2755), Dubno, Rivne Oblast
 301st Separate Road Traffic Control Battalion (301 окремий дорожньо-комендантський батальйон)
 304th Separate Road Traffic Control Battalion (304 окремий дорожньо-комендантський батальйон)
 48th Engineer 'Kamianets-Podilskaya Brigade (48 інженерна Кам'янець-Подільська бригада) (MU А2738), Kamianets-Podilskyi, Khmelnytskyi Oblast
 11th Separate Pontoon-Bridging Battalion (11 окремий понтонно-мостовий батальйон)
 308th Separate Engineer Technical Battalion (308 окремий інженерно-технічний батальйон)
 309th Separate Engineer Technical Battalion (309 окремий інженерно-технічний батальйон)
 310th Separate Engineer Technical Battalion (310 окремий інженерно-технічний батальйон)
 311th Separate Engineer Technical Battalion (311 окремий інженерно-технічний батальйон)
 321st Separate Engineer Battalion (321 окремий інженерний батальйон)
 70th Separate Support Regiment (70 окремий полк підтримки) (MU А0853), Bar, Vinnytsia Oblast
 107th Road Maintenance Center (107 центр дорожнього забезпечення) (MU А1519), Dubno, Rivne Oblast
 808th Separate Support Regiment (808 окремий полк підтримки) (MU А3955), Bilhorod-Dnistrovskyi, Odesa, Odesa Oblast
 3046th Central Base for Engineer Ammunitions (3046 центральна база інженерних боєприпасів) (MU А2647), Malynivka, Kharkiv Oblast
 Center for Special Engineering Works (Центр спеціальних інженерних робіт) (MU А1333), Kyiv
 Central Directorate of the NBC Defence Troops of the UAF (Центральне управління військ РХБЗ ЗСУ) (MU А0108), Kyiv
 NBC Surveillance and Analysis Center (Розрахунково-аналітичний центр), Kyiv
 704th Separate NBC Defence Regiment (704 окремий полк радіаційного, хімічного, біологічного захисту) (MU А0807), м. Самбір Львівської області
 536th Central Base for Repair and Maintenance of NBC Defence Equipment (536 центральна база ремонту і зберігання (озброєння РХБЗ)) (MU А0312), Seleshtina-1, Poltava Oblast
 Central Directorate for Radio-Electronic Warfare of the UAF (Центральне управління радіоелектронної боротьби ЗС України) (MU А0159), Kyiv
 55th Separate Special EW Center (55 окремий спеціальний центр РЕБ) (MU А0766), Kyiv and Brovary, Kyiv Oblast
 Central Directorate for Military Topography and Navigation of the UAF (Центральне управління воєнно-топографічне та навігації ЗС України) (MU А0115), Kyiv
 8th Publishing Center of the UAF (8 редакційно-видавничий центр ЗСУ) (MU А0602), Kyiv
 13th Photogrammetric Center (13 фотограмметричний центр) (MU А3674), Odesa, Odesa Oblast
 16th Planning Center for Navigation Support (16 центр планування та контролю навігаційного забезпечення) (MU А1423), Kyiv
 22nd Military Mapping Unit (22 військово-картографічна частина) (MU А1121), Kharkiv, Kharkiv Oblast
 64th Topography-Geodesic Center (64 топогеодезичний центр) (MU А4127), Shepetivka, Khmelnytskyi Oblast
 161st Topography-Geodesic Center (161 топогеодезичний центр) (MU А2308), Chernivtsi, Chernivtsi Oblast
 115th Mapping Center (115 картографічний центр) (MU А3796), Kotsyubynske, Kyiv Oblast
 Hydro-Meteorological Center of the UAF (Гідрометеорологічний центр ЗС України) (MU А0204), Kyiv
 hydro-meteorological units of the ground forces, air force and navy (Гідрометеорологічні (метеорологічних) підрозділи Повітряних Сил, ВМС та Сухопутних військ)
 training units (навчальні частини)
 Joint Education and Training Center of the Support Forces (Об’єднаний навчально-тренувальний центр Сил підтримки) (MU А2641), Kamianets-Podilskyi, Khmelnytskyi Oblast

 Logistical Forces 
Since January 1, 2022  the support forces have the status of a separate joint branch under the General Staff. The logistical forces are mainly organised in two arms - Weaponry and Rear Services.Logistical Forces Command of the Ukrainian Armed Forces (Командування Сил логістики Збройних Сил України) (MU А0307), Kyiv

 Armament Service of the UAF (Озброєння Збройних Сил України) (MU А2513)
 Central Support Directorate for Ground Weapons Systems (Центральне управління забезпечення наземними системами озброєння)
 Central Support Directorate for Military Equipment (Центральне управління забезпечення військовою технікою)
 Central Support Directorate for Weapons of Mass Destruction‎‎ (Центральне управління забезпечення засобами ураження)
 Central Missile and Artillery Directorate of the UAF (Центральне ракетно-артилерійське управління ЗС України) (MU А0120)
 Central Automobile Directorate of the UAF (Центральне автомобільне управління ЗС України) (MU А0119)
 Central Armored Directorate of the UAF (Центральне бронетанкове управління ЗС України) (MU А0174)
 Department for Metrology and Standardization of the UAF (Управління метрології та стандартизації ЗС України) (MU А2187)
 Rear Service of the Armed Forces of Ukraine (Тил Збройних Сил України) (MU А2516)
 Central Support Directorate for Fuel and Lubricants (Центральне управління забезпечення пально-мастильними матеріалами) (MU А0125)
 Central Support Directorate for Food Supply of the UAF (Центральне управління продовольчого забезпечення ЗС України) (MU А0126)
 Central Support Directorate for Material Support of the UAF (Центральне управління речового забезпечення ЗС України) (MU А0127)
 Central Support Directorate for Resources Supply (Центральне управління забезпечення ресурсами)
 Central Support Directorate for Technical Equipment and Property (Центральне управління забезпечення технічними засобами та майном)
 Central Support Directorate for Engineering and Infrastructure (Центральне управління інженерно-інфраструктурного забезпечення)
 Central Directorate for Military Communications of the UAF (Центральне управління військових сполучень ЗС України) (MU А0671)
 military units subordinated to the Armament Service (військові частини підпорядковані Озброєнню ЗСУ)
 military units subordinated to the Rear Service (військові частини підпорядковані Тилу ЗСУ)

 Medical Forces 
Since January 1, 2022  the support forces have the status of a separate joint branch under the General Staff.Medical Forces Command''' (Командування Медичних сил) (MU А0928), Kyiv

 National Military Medical Clinical Center 'Main Military Clinical Hospital (Національний військово-медичний клінічний центр «Головний військовий клінічний госпіталь»), Kyiv
 71st Mobile Military Hospital (71 мобільний військовий госпіталь) (MU А0358), Kyiv
 Military Medical Clinical Center for Professional Patology (ВМКЦ професійної патології особового складу) (MU А2923), Irpin, Kyiv Oblast
 Central Dental Policlinic (Центральна стоматологічна поліклініка), Kyiv
 Center for Medical Rehabilitation and Sanatorium Treatment 'Pushcha-Voditsya (Центр медичної реабілітації й санаторного лікування «Пуща-Водиця») (MU А1931), Kyiv
 Military Medical Clinical Center of the Central Region (''Військово-медичний клінічний центр Центрального регіону'') (MU А????), Vinnytsia, Vinnytsia Oblast
 59th Mobile Military Hospital (59 мобільний військовий госпіталь) (MU А0206), Vinnytsia, Vinnytsia Oblast
 10th Military Hospital (10 військовий госпіталь) (MU А2339, м. Хмельницький
 409th Military Hospital (409 військовий госпіталь) (MU А1065, м. Житомир
 762nd Military Hospital (762 військовий госпіталь) (MU А3122, м. Біла Церква
 ?th Military Hospital (? військовий госпіталь) (MU А3267, м. Старокостянтинів
 1314th Medical Storage (1314 медичний склад) (MU А1603, с. Балки Вінницької області
 Center for Medical Rehabilitation and Sanatorium Treatment 'Khmelnyk (Центр медичної реабілітації та санаторного лікування «Хмельник») (MU А1168), Khmelnyk, Vinnytsia Oblast
 Military Medical Clinical Center of the Southern Region (Військово-медичний клінічний центр Південного регіону) (MU A????), Odesa, Odesa Oblast
 38th Military Hospital (38 військовий госпіталь) (MU А4615), Dnipro, Dnipropetrovsk Oblast
 61st Military Hospital (61 військовий госпіталь) (MU А0318), Mariupol, Mariupol Oblast
 450th Military Hospital (450 військовий госпіталь) (MU А3309), Zaporizhzhia, Zaporizhzhia Oblast
 1467th Military Hospital (1467 військовий госпіталь) (MU А2428), Mykolaiv, Mykolaiv Oblast
 1644th Medical Storage (1644 медичний склад) (MU А4619), с. Грушівка Миколаївської області
 Center for Medical Rehabilitation and Sanatorium Treatment 'Odesskyi (Центр медичної реабілітації та санаторного лікування «Одеський»), Odesa, Odesa Oblast
 Military Medical Clinical Center of the Northern Region (Військово-медичний клінічний центр Північного регіону) (MU А3306), Kharkiv, Kharkiv Oblast
 65th Mobile Military Hospital (65 мобільний військовий госпіталь) (MU А0209, м. Харків
 9th Military Hospital (9 військовий госпіталь) (MU А4302), Desna, Chernihiv Oblast
 387th Garrison Military Hospital (387 гарнізонний військовий госпіталь) (MU А3114), Poltava, Poltava Oblast
 407th Military Hospital (407 військовий госпіталь) (MU А3120), Chernihiv, Chernihiv Oblast
 Military Medical Clinical Center of the Western Region (Військово-медичний клінічний центр Західного регіону), Lviv, Lviv Oblast
 66th Mobile Military Hospital (66 мобільний військовий госпіталь) (MU А0233), Lviv, Lviv Oblast
 376th Military Hospital (376 військовий госпіталь) (MU А1028), Chernivtsi, Chernivtsi Oblast
 498th Military Hispital (498 військовий госпіталь) (MU А4554), Lutsk, Volyn Oblast
 1121st Policlinic (1121 поліклініка), Ivano-Frankivsk, Ivano-Frankivsk Oblast
 1129th Garrison Military Hospital (1129 гарнізонний військовий госпіталь) (MU А1446), Rivne, Rivne Oblast
 1397th Military Hospital (1397 військовий госпіталь) (MU А1047), Mukachevo, Zakarpattia Oblast 
 Center for Medical Rehabilitation and Sanatorium Treatment 'Truskavetskyi (Центр медичної реабілітації й санаторного лікування «Трускавецький») (MU А1700), Truskavets, Lviv Oblast
 Central Sanitary Epidemiologic Directorate (Центральне санітарно-епідеміологічне управління) (MU А2417), Kyiv
 10th Regional Sanitary Epidemiologic Detachment (10 регіональний санітарно-епідеміологічний загін) (MU А0972), Kyiv
 27th Regional Sanitary Epidemiologic Detachment (27 регіональний санітарно-епідеміологічний загін) (MU А4502), Odesa, Odesa Oblast
 28th Regional Sanitary Epidemiologic Detachment (28 регіональний санітарно-епідеміологічний загін) (MU А4520), Lviv, Lviv Oblast
 108th Regional Sanitary Epidemiologic Detachment (108 регіональний санітарно-епідеміологічний загін) (MU А4510), Kharkiv, Kharkiv Oblast
 740th Regional Sanitary Epidemiologic Detachment (740 регіональний санітарно-епідеміологічний загін) (MU А4516), Vinnytsia, Vinnytsia Oblast
 Center for Legal Expertise of the MoD (Центр судових експертиз МОУ), Kyiv
 148th Center for Maintenance and Storage of Medical Equipment (148 центр формування й зберігання медичної техніки й майна) (MU А0211), Bila Tserkva, Kyiv Oblast
 149th Center for Maintenance and Storage of Medical Equipment (149 центр формування й зберігання медичної техніки й майна) (MU А0503), Berdychiv, Zhytomyr Oblast
 150th Center for Maintenance and Storage of Medical Equipment (150 центр формування й зберігання медичної техніки й майна) (MU А1209), Tokmak, Zaporizhzhia Oblast
 151st Center for Maintenance and Storage of Medical Equipment (151 центр формування й зберігання медичної техніки й майна) (MU А2554), Terentyivka, Poltava Oblast
 2160th Central Medical Storage (2160 центральний медичний склад) (MU А1382), Mankhivka, Cherkasy Oblast
 4962nd Central Medical Storage (4962 центральний медичний склад) (MU А1952), Kyiv

training establishments and units (навчальні заклади та частини)

 Ukrainian Military Medical Academy (Українська військово-медична академія), Kyiv

medical forces under other services and arms (iнші види та роди військ (сил))

 medical departments of the ground forces, air force, navy, air assault troops, special forces, territorial defence, support forces, logistic forces, signals and cyber-security, etc. (медичні підрозділи Сухопутних військ, Повітряних Сил, ВМС, ДШВ, ССпО, СТрО, Сил підтримки, Сил логістики, Військ зв'язку та кібербезпеки)

Military Police 
The military police (named Military Law Enforcement Service of the Ukrainian Armed Forces (Військова служба правопорядку Збройних Сил України), abbreviated VSP (ВСП) in Ukrainian) is a special military service outside of General Staff control and subordinated directly to the Ministry of Defence.

Main Directorate of the VSP (Головне управління Військової служби правопорядку Збройних Сил України) (MU А0880), Kyiv

 Counterincursion and Counterterror Department (Відділ протидії диверсіям та терористичним актам)

directly reporting:

 93rd Separate VSP Battalion (93 окремий батальйон Військової служби правопорядку) (MU А2424), Kyiv
 138th Special Purpose Center (Counterincursion and Counterterror) 'Knyaz Vladimir Svyatoslavich (138 центр спеціального призначення (протидії диверсіям та терористичним атакам) імені князя Володимира Святославича) (MU А0952), Vasylkiv, Kyiv Oblast
 307th Disciplinary Battalion of the VPS (307 дисциплінарний батальйон Військової служби правопорядку) (MU А0488), Kyiv
 25th Training Center of the VSP (25 навчальний центр Військової служби правопорядку) (MU А1666), Lviv, Lviv Oblast

territorial forces:Central Directorate (Центральне управління) (direct responsibility over Kyiv and Kyiv Oblast) (MU А2100), Kyiv

 Bila Tserkva Zonal Office (Білоцерківське зональне відділення), Bila Tserkva, Kyiv Oblast
 Zhytomyr Zonal Unit (Житомирський зональний відділ) (AOR: Zhytomyr Oblast), Zhytomyr, Zhytomyr Oblast
 Novohrad-Volynsky Office (Новоград-Волинське відділення)
 Poltava Zonal Unit (Полтавський зональний відділ) (AOR: Poltava and Sumy Oblasts), Poltava, Poltava Oblast
 Sumy Zonal Office (Сумське зональне відділення)
 Konotop VSP Group (Група ВСП м. Конотоп)
 Cherkasy Zonal Unit (Черкаський зональний відділ) (AOR: Cherkasy Oblast), Cherkasy, Cherkasy Oblast
 Uman VSP Group (Група ВСП м. Умань), Uman, Cherkasy Oblast
 Chernihiv Zonal Unit (Чернігівський зональний відділ) (AOR: Chernihiv Oblast), Chernihiv, Chernihiv Oblast
 Desna VSP Group (Група ВСП смт. Десна), Desna, Chernihiv OblastWestern Territorial Directorate (Західне територіальне управління) (direct responsibility over Lviv Oblast) (MU А0583), Lviv, Lviv Oblast

 Special Purpose Unit (Відділ спеціального призначення)
 Yavoriv Zonal Office (Яворівське зональне відділення)
 3rd Special Unit (3 спеціальний відділ) (MU А2736), Lviv, Lviv Oblast
 Rivne Zonal Unit (Рівненський зональний відділ) (AOR: Rivne and Volyn Oblasts), Rivne, Rivne Oblast
 Volodymyr-Volynskyi Zonal Office (Володимир-Волинське зональне відділення)
 Ternopil Zonal Unit (Тернопільський зональний відділ) (AOR: Ternopil and Ivano-Frankivsk Oblasts), Ternopil, Ternopil Oblast
 Ivano-Frankivsk Zonal Office (Івано-Франківське зональне відділення)
 Uzhhorod Zonal Unit (Ужгородський зональний відділ) (AOR: Zakarpattia Oblast), Uzhhorod
 Mukachevo Zonal Office (Мукачівське зональне відділення)
 Khmelnytskyi Zonal Unit (Хмельницький зональний відділ) (AOR: Khmelnytskyi Oblast), Khmelnytskyi, Khmelnytskyi OblastSouthern Territorial Directorate (Південне територіальне управління) (direct responsibility over Odesa Oblast) (MU А1495), Odesa, Odesa Oblast

 Special Purpose Unit (Відділ спеціального призначення)
 VSP Office Bilhorod-Dnistrovskyi (Відділення ВСП м. Білгород-Дністровський)
 Vinnytsia Zonal Unit (Вінницький зональний відділ) (AOR: Vinnytsia Oblast), Vinnytsia, Vinnytsia Oblast
 Special Purpose Office (Відділення спеціального призначення)
 Mykolaiv Zonal Unit (Миколаївський зональний відділ) (AOR: Mykolaiv and Kirovohrad Oblast), Mykolaiv, Mykolaiv Oblast
 Kirovohrad Zonal Office (Кіровоградське зональне відділення)
 Kherson Zonal Unit (Херсонський зональний відділ) (AOR: Kherson Oblast), Kherson, Kherson OblastEastern Territorial Directorate''' (Східне територіальне управління) (direct responsibility over Dnipropetrovsk Oblast) (MU А2256), Dnipro, Dnipropetrovsk Oblast

 Kryvyi Rih Zonal Office (Криворізьке зональне відділення)
 VSP Office Cherkasy (Відділення ВСП смт. Черкаське Новомосковського району)
 Special Unit 'Sarmat' (Спеціальний відділ «Сармат») (MU А2176), Zaporizhzhia, Zaporizhzhia Oblast
 Donetsk Zonal Unit (Донецький зональний відділ) (AOR: Donetsk Oblast), Kramatorsk, Donetsk Oblast
 Zaporizhzhia Zonal Unit (Запорізький зональний відділ) (AOR: Zaporizhzhia Oblast), Zaporizhzhia, Zaporizhzhia Oblast
 Luhansk Zonal Unit (Луганський зональний відділ) (AOR: Luhansk Oblast), Severodonetsk, Luhansk Oblast
 Kharkiv Zonal Unit (Харківський зональний відділ) (AOR: Kharkiv Oblast), Kharkiv, Kharkiv Oblast
 Chuhuiv Office (Чугуївське відділення Харківського ЗВ ВСП'')

References 

Military of Ukraine
Structure of contemporary armed forces